A virtual concert, also called V-concert or virtual live, refers to a performance in which the performers are represented by virtual avatars. Virtual concerts can take place in real life, where digital representations of the performers are projected in on stage, or within fully digital virtual worlds. Real life concerts are popular in South Korea, where performances by groups such as Girls' Generation have attracted thousands of fans. Performers in virtual concerts may represent real individuals, but can also be entirely fictitious characters like Hatsune Miku.

More recently, virtual concerts have taken place in video games. Games like Fortnite Battle Royale and Minecraft have been used by artists as venues to reach wider audiences and offer interactive experiences for attendees.

History

Early beginnings 
Within the K-pop music industry, V-concerts were first introduced by several South Korean record labels such as SM Entertainment and YG Entertainment. In 1998, SM Entertainment attempted to kick start its first holographic debut with H.O.T. (a now-defunct boy band), but failed to do so.

South Korean revival and expansion 
On January 5, 2013, a breakthrough occurred after SM Entertainment held a virtual concert in Gangnam District with life-sized images of Girls’ Generation projected onto the stage, attracting thousands of K-pop fans.

After its first virtual concert featuring Psy's "Gangnam Style" took off at the COEX Convention & Exhibition Center in May 2013, the South Korean record label YG Entertainment announced that it plans to establish 20 venues for virtual performances of its K-pop singers by the year 2015 in North America, Europe, China, Hong Kong, Singapore and Thailand.

On July 20, 2013, YG Entertainment launched a permanent virtual concert at the Everland theme park in Yongin, South Korea. Under the slogan "K-Pop Hologram: YG at Everland", virtual performances include Psy's "Gentleman" and "Gangnam Style" as well as virtual concerts by Big Bang and 2NE1.

In video games and virtual worlds

Since the mid-2000s, virtual concerts have also been held in virtual worlds instead of physical locations. The first major band to perform live in a virtual world was Duran Duran, who performed in Second Life in 2006. In the same year, Phil Collins appeared in Grand Theft Auto: Vice City Stories performing his single "In The Air Tonight"; the concert is accessible as part of the game.

In January 2019, a virtual music festival called Fire Festival (named as a play on the infamous 2017 Fyre Festival) was held on a dedicated Minecraft server. Organized by Canadian producer Max Schramp, the event was held in support of LGBT suicide prevention organization The Trevor Project. The following month, on February 2, EDM producer Marshmello held a ten-minute concert on the main map of third-person shooter Fortnite Battle Royale. The concert was viewable to anyone playing the game during that time, and a special variant of its "Team Rumble" game mode with respawns enabled was provided for the event.

Virtual concerts grew in popularity through 2020 and 2021 due to restrictions set by the COVID-19 pandemic that made it difficult to hold traditional concerts. More concerts were held in Fortnite featuring artists including Travis Scott, BTS, Diplo, and Ariana Grande as interactive experiences. Fortnite would continue to host virtual concerts on a smaller and more social-oriented side map called "Party Royale." On April 16, 2020, American singer-songwriter Soccer Mommy collaborated with Club Penguin Rewritten fangame to host an in-game concert for her album Color Theory. On the social platform VRChat, a number of groups have organized digital nightclubs and music festivals with live streamed DJ performances by users and producers, hosted in specially-designed worlds on the platform that mimic real-life venues.

Many virtual performances have begun experimenting with virtual and augmented reality. TheWave, a dedicated platform for virtual reality concerts, launched in 2017. Artists who have performed on the platform include Imogen Heap, The Glitch Mob, and Kill the Noise; the service shut down in 2021, with the company stating that it was focusing on distributing its productions via "popular streaming platforms" instead. In August 2020, Canadian singer the Weeknd collaborated with social media platform TikTok to hold an interactive augmented reality live stream titled "The Weeknd Experience" on various dates, with the first occurring on August 7, 2020.

Production costs 
A virtual K-pop music video costs over US$180,000 and is about two to three times more expensive than a normal K-pop video.

Criticism 
V-concerts have been criticized by K-pop fans because singers do not appear in person and are only electronically projected onto a screen. Some claim that V-concerts could possibly endanger the quality of live music.

See also 
 Metaverse
 Virtual band
 Virtual event

References 
 
Virtual avatars
K-pop